Mystify may refer to:

In Film
 Mystify: Michael Hutchence, a 2019 documentary about the life of Michael Hutchence, lead singer of INXS.

In Music
 Mystify: A Musical Journey with Michael Hutchence, a 2019 album by Michael Hutchence.
 "Mystify" (song), 1989 single by INXS
 "Mystify" (Saving Abel song), a 2013 single

See also
 Mystification (disambiguation)
 Mystified (disambiguation)
 Mysticism